Tullylease GAA is a Gaelic Athletic Association club based in the village of Tullylease in the north-west of County Cork, Ireland which forms part of the parish of Milford, Freemount and Tullylease. The club plays in the Duhallow division and competes in both Hurling and Gaelic Football competitions. They currently compete at Junior B level.

Tullylease won the Duhallow Junior A Hurling League in 2009  and the Duhallow Junior A Hurling Championship in 2008 ending a baron run of 47 years in which Tullylease had been runners-up ten times. Tullylease lost to Diarmuid Ó Mathúna's in the 2008 semifinal of the Cork Junior Hurling Championship.
In 2010, the club hosted the final of the Duhallow Junior A Hurling Championship for the first time.

In 2016, due to lack of numbers for multiple reasons, Tullylease joined with Lismire GAA. The club plays under Lismire’s name in football and Tullylease’s name in hurling. In 2016 they won the Duhallow Junior B Football Championship defeating Glenlara in the final.

Honours
Duhallow Junior A Hurling Championship
  Winners (5): 1945, 1958, 1959, 1961, 2008
  Runners-Up (12): 1957, 1965, 1967, 1970, 1971, 1975, 1976, 1978, 1979, 1981, 2007, 2013
Duhallow Junior A Hurling League
  Winners (1): 2009
 Cork Junior B Hurling Championship
  Runners-Up (3): 1992, 1995, 1998

See also
 Duhallow GAA

References

Gaelic games clubs in County Cork
Gaelic football clubs in County Cork